The 1984 Grote Prijs Jef Scherens was the 20th edition of the Grote Prijs Jef Scherens cycle race and was held on 16 September 1984. The race started and finished in Leuven. The race was won by Ronny Van Holen.

General classification

References

1984
1984 in road cycling
1984 in Belgian sport